The Irish Republican Socialist Party or IRSP is a Marxist-Leninist and republican party in Ireland. It is often referred to as the "political wing" of the Irish National Liberation Army (INLA) paramilitary group. It was founded in 1974, during the Troubles, by former members of the Workers' Party, but claims the legacy of the Irish Socialist Republican Party of 1896–1904.

History

Early years

The Irish Republican Socialist Party was founded at a meeting on 8 December 1974 in the Spa Hotel in Lucan, near Dublin, by former members of Workers' Party (aka 'Official' Sinn Féin), headed by Seamus Costello. According to the IRSP, 80 people were in attendance. A paramilitary wing, the Irish National Liberation Army (INLA), was founded the same day, although its existence was intended to be kept hidden until such a time that the INLA could operate effectively. Costello was elected as the party's first chairperson and the Army's first chief of staff. Together, the IRSP and the INLA were referred to as the Irish Republican Socialist Movement (IRSM).

Former Unity MP for Mid-Ulster Bernadette McAliskey served on the executive of the IRSP. She resigned following the failure of a motion to be passed which would have brought the INLA under the control of the IRSP  (executive committee). Tony Gregory, a future Dublin TD, was also a member for a short time. Its poor showing in the 1977 Irish general election, and the assassination of Seamus Costello, weakened the organisation.

Costello had been expelled from the Official Irish Republican Army (OIRA) following a court-martial, and from Official Sinn Féin on the same basis. Along with other activists, he was dissatisfied with the group's tactics and policies, especially on the issues surrounding the 1972 OIRA ceasefire and his growing belief that the emerging conflict was sectarian.

Clashes with other republicans and the British

On 5 October 1977, Costello was shot dead in his car by a man armed with a shotgun. His supporters blamed the Official IRA for the killing.

Following meetings between the INLA and OIRA leadership in Dublin, a truce was eventually reached, but in one of the first of the INLA's armed operations, Billy McMillen, commanding officer of the OIRA Belfast Battalion, was murdered by Gerard Steenson. In the following years, the IRSP and INLA saw several of their members, including Miriam Daly, Ronnie Bunting and Noel Little killed by Ulster loyalist paramilitaries, most prominently the Ulster Defence Association (UDA).

Three members of the INLA died in the 1981 Irish hunger strike in HM Prison Maze, also known as Long Kesh: Patsy O'Hara, Kevin Lynch, and Michael Devine.

In 1987, the INLA and its political wing, the IRSP came under attack from the Irish People's Liberation Organisation (IPLO), an organisation founded by people who had resigned or been expelled from the INLA. The IPLO's initial aim was to destroy the IRSM and replace it with their organisation. Five members of the INLA and IRSP were killed by the IPLO, including leaders Ta Power and John O'Reilly. The INLA retaliated with several killings of their own. After the INLA killed the IPLO's leader, Gerard Steenson, a truce was reached. Although severely damaged by the IPLO's attacks, the INLA continued to exist. The IPLO, which was heavily involved in drug dealing, was put out of existence by the Provisional IRA in a large scale operation in 1992.

Recent history
In the 2000s and 2010s, the IRSP has been involved in campaigns and political protests, mainly around Belfast and Derry but also in of parts of the Republic of Ireland as well.

In November 2016, after a number of raids on members of the party's homes, the IRSP issued a warning saying the PSNI were "playing with fire". IRSP's Lower Falls representative Michael Kelly claimed that “British security forces risk bringing serious conflict onto the streets” and said that “The Irish Republican Socialist Party has been in existence for over 40 years, in that time we have never tolerated attacks on our membership from any quarter,” The comments drew criticism from UUP MLA Doug Beattie and SDLP Alex Attwood.

Elections

In 1981, party members Gerry Kelly and Sean Flynn won two seats on the Belfast City Council in a joint campaign with the People's Democracy party. Neither councillor served a full term, with one going on the run after being implicated during the supergrass trials

The IRSP put forward five candidates in Northern Ireland local elections, 2011, its first foray into electoral politics in almost 30 years. They failed to secure any seats. Candidate Paul Gallagher of Strabane missed out on a seat by just a single vote. He was originally elected but after a requested recount by the SDLP his election was overturned.

The IRSP has explained its lack of participation in elections as due to "very limited" resources.

In 2022 for the first time the IRSP fielded candidates for the Northern Ireland Assembly election. Initially their candidates were rejected by the Electoral Commission, but this was eventually corrected. Candidates were fielded in Belfast West (1,103 first preference votes, 2.5%) and Foyle (766 first preference votes, 1.6%).

Policies and ideology

The IRSP are Marxist–Leninist and Irish republican, seeking the establishment of an all-Ireland "worker's republic". As of 2009, the IRSP stated that their objective will only be achieved exclusively through peaceful and political means, and in 2018 they launched the 'Yes For Unity' campaign, to campaign for a Border Poll on Irish Unity.

The IRSP claim the legacy of Connolly and say their policies are of the same tradition of Connolly. The IRSP also see their own modern policies as the "logical development in the twenty-first century of the programme established under Connolly’s leadership by the Irish Socialist Republican Party".

Physical force Irish republicanism

The IRSP opposes both the Good Friday Agreement and the Northern Ireland Peace Process, The party supports a 'No First Strike' policy, allowing people to see the perceived failure of the peace process for themselves without taking military actions.

As of 11 October 2009, the INLA has ordered an end to the armed struggle, because unlike during the Troubles, the current political stance in Ulster allows the IRSP to contest fairly in new campaigns and local elections, as mentioned in their 2009 statement. INLA admitted to "faults and grievous errors" in their prosecution of the armed struggle, stating that "innocent people were killed and injured" and offering "as revolutionaries" a "sincere and heartfelt apology".

European Union
The IRSP supported Brexit and supports the Republic of Ireland leaving the European Union.

NATO and Russia
During the Russo-Ukrainian War, the IRSP publicly declared their support for the Donetsk People's Republic and Luhansk People's Republic. It blamed NATO rather than Russia for the conflict and claimed Ukraine was ruled by a "fascist" government. On 25 February 2022, one day after Russia invaded Ukraine, the party re-affirmed its support for the Republics in a social media post in which they called Ukraine a "Nazi regime" and a "NATO puppet". It included a picture of IRSP members posing in front of Free Derry Corner with a Soviet flag and the flag of the Donetsk People's Republic. The party boasted about the INLA's bombing of a radar station on Mount Gabriel, County Cork in 1982, which it said was used by NATO. In August 2022, IRSP members and Russian nationalists staged a protest against the Ukrainian military, outside Dublin's General Post Office. The Irish security services believe the Russian government were involved in organizing the protest.

Broad Front
The IRSP supports the formation of what it calls the "Broad Front" which would oppose British occupation and imperialism in Ireland. Policies would include:

 UK must denounce all claims of sovereignty over the island
 Withdrawal of all UK troops and release of all republican prisoners
 UK to compensate the Irish people for the exploitation that has occurred throughout Ireland.

Policing
The IRSP is in favour of an All-Ireland, democratically controlled, unarmed police force.

Abstentionism
The IRSP are not abstentionist in principle but they would support abstentionism in certain situations for tactical reasons.

Housing
IRSP believes that the right to a home is a fundamental human right and that the state has a responsibility to deal with homelessness.

Abortion
The party's policy on abortion is that it should be legalised, available on demand and free of charge.

Membership
Party members are often referred to as the "Irps" (pronounced "Erps"). In the late 1970s, Divis Flats in west Belfast became colloquially known as "the planet of the Irps" (a reference to the IRSP and the film Planet of the Apes).

Representation
The party is represented in North America by the Irish Republican Socialist Committees of North America.

List of secretaries
 Kevin Morley
 John Martin
 Mick Plunkett

Milestones in the IRSP's history
 1975: At the IRSP's inaugural convention, it becomes the first political party in Ireland to support the legalisation of abortion and equal rights for gays and lesbians.
 1981: The IRSP wins two seats on the Belfast City Council, and comes close to winning a third. The IRSP runs two candidates, Kevin Lynch and Tony O'Hara, in the Irish parliamentary election as Independent Anti H-Block candidates. Neither candidate wins, but Lynch comes within 300 votes of winning a seat, while O'Hara garnered a respectable number of votes.
 1982: Party member Brigid Makowski wins a seat on the Shannon Town Commission.

See also
 Jim Lane
 Sallins Train Robbery

References

Further reading
 Bernard, Margie. Daughter of Derry: The Story of Brigid Sheils Makowski; iUniverse; 20 January 2009;

External links
 Irish Republican Socialist Party's official website
 Brief history of the IRSP 
 IRSP Dublin branch blog

 
Opposition to NATO
Far-left politics in Ireland